USS Cape Lookout was a supply ship in the United States Navy. She was named by the U.S. Navy for Cape Lookout, which are points on the coasts of both North Carolina and Washington.
 
Cape Lookout (No. 3214) was launched in 1918 by Bethlehem Shipbuilding Corp., Sparrows Point, Maryland; acquired by the Navy 26 July 1918; commissioned the same day and reported to the Naval Overseas Transportation Service.

Atlantic Ocean operations 
Between 10 August and 12 December 1918, Cape Lookout made two transatlantic voyages between Baltimore and New York and French ports, carrying supplies for the American Expeditionary Force. The cargo ship sailed from Baltimore on 24 January 1919, carrying 5,864 tons of flour to Trieste, Austria, as part of the relief assistance provided for the rebuilding of war-shattered Europe by the United States Food Administration. While homeward-bound Cape Lookout answered a distress call from US Army Transportation Corps ship USAT Melrose which had a disabled rudder. Cape Lookout took Melrose in tow for two days, until the latter could make repairs and proceed unassisted.

Decommissioning 
Cape Lookout returned to Baltimore 29 March 1919, and was decommissioned there 7 April 1919. She was returned to the Shipping Board the same day.

References

External links 
 Dictionary of American Naval Fighting Ships

Ships built in Sparrows Point, Maryland
1918 ships
Cargo ships of the United States Navy
World War I cargo ships of the United States
World War I auxiliary ships of the United States
Standard World War I ships
Steamships of the United States